The University of Minnesota School of Public Health, located in Minneapolis, Minnesota, is a professional school of the University of Minnesota. The school offers 16 masters programs and four doctoral programs, which culminate in one of the following degrees: Master of Public Health (M.P.H.), Master of Healthcare Administration (M.H.A.), Master of Science (M.S.), or Doctoral (Ph.D.). There are also many dual degree programs, such as those with the Law School, the School of Nursing, the Hubert H. Humphrey Institute of Public Affairs and School of Social Work.

The School of Public Health was founded in 1944, although public health courses have been offered at the University of Minnesota since its inception in 1874. The School's faculty coordinated the pioneering Seven Countries Study directed by Professors Ancel Keys and Henry Blackburn.

U.S. News & World Report consistently ranks the UMN School of Public Health among the top 10 schools of public health in the country. Most recently in 2022, the school was ranked 11th for the 2023 school year. Since 2019, the publication ranked the schools' Healthcare Administration program as #2 in the nation, up from #3 in 2015.

Notable people
Ancel Keys, Professor
Michael Osterholm, Professor

References

External links 
University of Minnesota School of Public Health main page
History & Mission of the University of Minnesota School of Public Health

Universities and colleges in Minneapolis
Minnesota, University of
Educational institutions established in 1944
1944 establishments in Minnesota
Medical and health organizations based in Minnesota